The 59th parallel south is a circle of latitude that is 59 degrees south of the Earth's equatorial plane.  The only landmass on this parallel is Bristol Island.

At this latitude the sun is visible for 18 hours, 30 minutes during the December solstice and 6 hours, 10 minutes during the June solstice.

Around the world
Starting at the Prime Meridian and heading eastwards, the parallel 59° south passes through:

{| class="wikitable plainrowheaders"
! scope="col" width="125" | Co-ordinates
! scope="col" | Territory or ocean
! scope="col" | Notes
|-
| style="background:#b0e0e6;" | 
! scope="row" style="background:#b0e0e6;" | Atlantic Ocean
| style="background:#b0e0e6;" |
|-
| style="background:#b0e0e6;" | 
! scope="row" style="background:#b0e0e6;" | Indian Ocean
| style="background:#b0e0e6;" |
|-
| style="background:#b0e0e6;" | 
! scope="row" style="background:#b0e0e6;" | Pacific Ocean
| style="background:#b0e0e6;" | Passing through the Drake Passage between South America and the Antarctic Peninsula
|-
| style="background:#b0e0e6;" | 
! scope="row" style="background:#b0e0e6;" | Atlantic Ocean
| style="background:#b0e0e6;" | Running through the Scotia Sea
|-
| 
! scope="row" | 
| Bristol Island (claimed by )
|-
| style="background:#b0e0e6;" | 
! scope="row" style="background:#b0e0e6;" | Atlantic Ocean
| style="background:#b0e0e6;" | 
|}

See also
58th parallel south
60th parallel south

Notes

References

s59